Football Club Galaksia, commonly known as Galaksia, is a professional football club from Kosovo which competes in the Second League. The club is based in Gjilan. Their home ground is the Galaksia Stadium which has a seating capacity of 1,000.

See also
 List of football clubs in Kosovo

References

Football clubs in Kosovo
Association football clubs established in 2008
Sport in Gjilan